East Africa, Eastern Africa, or East of Africa, is the eastern subregion of the African continent. In the United Nations Statistics Division scheme of geographic regions, 10-11-(16*) territories make up Eastern Africa:

Scientific consensus states the region of East Africa is where anatomically modern humans first evolved circa 200,000 years ago before migrating northwards and eastwards out of Africa.

Due to the historical Omani Empire and colonial territories of the British East Africa Protectorate and German East Africa, the term East Africa is often (especially in the English language) used to specifically refer to the area now comprising the three countries of Kenya, Tanzania, and Uganda. However, this has never been the convention in many other languages, where the term generally had a wider, strictly geographic context and therefore typically included Djibouti, Eritrea, Ethiopia, and Somalia.

Tanzania, Kenya, Uganda, Rwanda, Burundi, Democratic Republic of Congo and South Sudan are members of the East African Community. The first five are also included in the African Great Lakes region. Burundi and Rwanda are at times also considered to be part of Central Africa.
 Djibouti, Eritrea, Ethiopia and Somalia are collectively known as the Horn of Africa. The area is the easternmost projection of the African continent.
 Comoros, Mauritius, and Seychelles – small island nations in the Indian Ocean.
 Réunion, Mayotte (geographically a part of the Comoro Islands) and the Scattered Islands in the Indian Ocean – French overseas territories also in the Indian Ocean.
 Mozambique and Madagascar – often considered part of Southern Africa, on the eastern side of the sub-continent. Madagascar has close cultural ties to both Southeast Asia and East Africa, and the islands of the Indian Ocean.
 Malawi, Zambia, and Zimbabwe – often also included in Southern Africa, and formerly constituted the Central African Federation (also known historically as the Federation of Rhodesia and Nyasaland).
 South Sudan and Sudan – collectively part of the Nile Valley. They are situated in the northeastern portion of the continent. Also members of the Common Market for Eastern and Southern Africa (COMESA) free trade area.

Geography and climate 

Some parts of East Africa have been renowned for their concentrations of wild animals, such as the "big five": the elephant, buffalo, lion, black rhinoceros, and leopard, though populations have been declining under increased stress in recent times, particularly those of the rhino and elephant.

The geography of East Africa is often stunning and scenic. Shaped by global plate tectonic forces that have created the East African Rift, East Africa is the site of Mount Kilimanjaro and Mount Kenya, the two tallest peaks in Africa. It also includes the world's second largest freshwater lake, Lake Victoria, and the world's second deepest lake, Lake Tanganyika.

The climate of East Africa is rather atypical of equatorial regions. Because of a combination of the region's generally high altitude and the rain shadow of the westerly monsoon winds created by the Rwenzori Mountains and Ethiopian Highlands, East Africa is surprisingly cool and dry for its latitude. In fact, on the coast of Somalia, many years can go by without any rain whatsoever. Unusually, most of the rain falls in two distinct wet seasons, one centred on April and the other in October or November. This is usually attributed to the passage of the Intertropical Convergence Zone across the region in those months, but it may also be analogous to the autumn monsoon rains of parts of Sri Lanka, Vietnam, and the Brazilian Nordeste.

West of the Rwenzoris and Ethiopian highlands, the rainfall pattern is more typically tropical, with rain throughout the year near the equator and a single wet season in most of the Ethiopian Highlands from June to September – contracting to July and August around Asmara.

Rainfall in East Africa is characterised by two main rainfall seasons, the long rains from March–May and the short rains from October- December. Rainfall variability is influenced by both El Niño events and a positive Indian Ocean Dipole. El Nino events tend to increase rainfall except in the northern and western parts of the Ethiopian and Eritrean highlands, where they produce drought and poor Nile floods. Similarly, a positive Indian Ocean Dipole result in warm sea-surface temperatures off the coast of East Africa and lead to increased rainfall over East Africa.

The unique geography and apparent suitability for farming made East Africa a target for European exploration, exploitation and colonialization in the nineteenth century. Today, tourism is an important part of the economies of Kenya, Tanzania, Seychelles, and Uganda. The easternmost point of the continent, that is Ras Hafun in Somalia, is of archaeological, historical and economical importance.

History

Prehistory

According to the theory of the recent African origin of modern humans, the predominantly held belief among most archaeologists, East Africa in the area of the African Great Lakes is where anatomically modern humans first appeared. There are differing theories on whether there was a single exodus or several; a multiple dispersal model involves the Southern Dispersal theory. Some researchers have suggested that North Africa was the region of Africa from which modern humans who first trekked out of the continent.

According to both genetic and fossil evidence, it has been posited that archaic Homo sapiens evolved into anatomically modern humans in the Horn of Africa around 200,000 years ago and dispersed from there. The recognition of Homo sapiens idaltu and Omo Kibish as anatomically modern humans would justify the description of contemporary humans with the subspecies name Homo sapiens sapiens. Because of their early dating and unique physical characteristics idaltu and kibish represent the immediate ancestors of anatomically modern humans as suggested by the Out-of-Africa theory.  
In 2017 finds of modern human remains, dating to ca 300,000 years ago in Jebel Irhoud in Morocco, suggested that modern humans arose earlier and possibly in a larger area of Africa than previously thought.

East Africa is one of the earliest regions where Homo sapiens are believed to have lived. Evidence was found in 2018, dating to about 320,000 years ago, at the Kenyan site of Olorgesailie, of the early emergence of modern behaviors associated with Homo sapiens, including: long-distance trade networks (involving goods such as obsidian), the use of pigments, and the possible making of projectile points. It is observed by the authors of three 2018 studies on the site, that the evidence of these behaviors is approximately contemporary to the earliest known Homo sapiens fossil remains from Africa (such as at Jebel Irhoud and Florisbad), and they suggest that complex and modern behaviors had already begun in Africa around the time of the emergence of Homo sapiens.

In September 2019, scientists reported the computerized determination, based on 260 CT scans, of a virtual skull shape of the last common human ancestor to modern humans/H. sapiens, representative of the earliest Homo sapiens, and suggested that Homo sapiens arose between 350,000 and 260,000 years ago through a merging of populations in South and East Africa.

The migration route of the "Out of Africa" theory probably occurred in East Africa however through Bab el Mandeb

Today at the Bab-el-Mandeb straits, the Red Sea is about 12 miles (20 kilometres) wide, but 50,000 years ago it was much narrower and sea levels were 70 meters lower. Though the straits were never completely closed, there may have been islands in between which could be reached using simple rafts.

Some of the earliest hominin skeletal remains have been found in the wider region, including fossils discovered in the Awash Valley of Ethiopia, as well as in the Koobi Fora in Kenya and Olduvai Gorge in Tanzania.

The southern part of East Africa was occupied until recent times by Khoisan hunter-gatherers, whereas in the Ethiopian Highlands the donkey and such crop plants as teff allowed the beginning of agriculture around 7,000 BCE. Lowland barriers and diseases carried by the tsetse fly, however, prevented the donkey and agriculture from spreading southwards. Only in quite recent times has agriculture spread to the more humid regions south of the equator, through the spread of cattle, sheep and crops such as millet. Language distributions suggest that this most likely occurred from Sudan into the African Great Lakes region, since the Nilotic languages spoken by these pre-Bantu farmers have their closest relatives in the middle Nile basin.

Ancient history

Djibouti, Eritrea, Ethiopia, Somalia, and the Red Sea coast of Sudan are considered the most likely location of the land known to the Ancient Egyptians as Punt. The old kingdom's first mention dates to the 25th century BCE. The ancient Puntites were a nation of people that had close relations with Pharaonic Egypt during the times of Pharaoh Sahure and Queen Hatshepsut.

The Kingdom of Aksum was a trading empire centered  Eritrea and northern Ethiopia. It existed from approximately 100–940 CE, growing from the proto-Aksumite Iron Age period c. 4th century BCE to achieve prominence by the 1st century CE. The kingdom is mentioned in the Periplus of the Erythraean Sea as an important market place for ivory, which was exported throughout the ancient world. Aksum was at the time ruled by Zoskales, who also governed the port of Adulis. The Aksumite rulers facilitated trade by minting their own Aksumite currency. The state also established its hegemony over the declining Kingdom of Kush and regularly entered the politics of the kingdoms on the Arabian peninsula, eventually extending its rule over the region with the conquest of the Himyarite Kingdom.

Bantu expansion

Between 2500 and 3000 years ago, Bantu-speaking peoples began a millennia-long series of migrations eastward from their homeland around southern Cameroon. This Bantu expansion introduced agriculture into much of the African Great Lakes region. During the following fifteen centuries, the Bantu slowly intensified farming and grazing over all suitable regions of East Africa, in the process making contact with Austronesian- and Arabic-speaking settlers on southern coastal areas. The latter also spread Islam to the coastal belt, but most Bantu remained African Traditional Religion adherents.

Over a period of many centuries, most hunting-foraging peoples were displaced and absorbed by incoming Bantu communities, as well as by later Nilotic communities. The Bantu expansion was a long series of physical migrations, a diffusion of language and knowledge out into and in from neighboring populations, and a creation of new societal groups involving inter-marriage among communities and small groups moving to communities and small groups moving to new areas.

After their movements from their original homeland in West Africa, Bantus also encountered in central east Africa peoples of Cushitic origin. As cattle terminology in use amongst the few modern Bantu pastoralist groups suggests, the Bantu migrants would acquire cattle from their new Cushitic neighbors. Linguistic evidence also indicates that Bantus most likely borrowed the custom of milking cattle directly from Cushitic peoples in the area.

On the coastal section of the African Great Lakes region, another mixed Bantu community developed through contact with Muslim Arab and Persian traders, leading to the development of the mixed Arab, Persian and African Swahili City States. The Swahili culture that emerged from these exchanges evinces many Arab and Islamic influences not seen in traditional Bantu culture, as do the many Afro-Arab members of the Bantu Swahili people. With its original speech community centered on the coastal parts of Tanzania (particularly Zanzibar) and Kenya—a seaboard referred to as the Swahili Coast—the Bantu Swahili language contains many Arabic loan-words as a consequence of these interactions.

The earliest Bantu inhabitants of the east coast of Kenya and Tanzania encountered by these later Arab and Persian settlers have been variously identified with the trading settlements of Rhapta, Azania and Menouthias referenced in early Greek and Chinese writings from 50 CE to 500 CE, ultimately giving rise to the name for Tanzania. These early writings perhaps document the first wave of Bantu settlers to reach central east Africa during their migration.

Between the 14th and 15th centuries, large African Great Lakes kingdoms and states emerged, such as the Buganda and Karagwe kingdoms of Uganda and Tanzania.

Modern history

Arab and Portuguese eras

The Portuguese were the first Europeans to explore the region of current-day Kenya, Tanzania, and Mozambique by sea. Vasco da Gama visited Mombasa in 1498. Da Gama's voyage was successful in reaching India, which permitted the Portuguese to trade with the Far East directly by sea. This in turn challenged the older trading networks of mixed land and sea routes, such as the spice trade routes which utilized the Persian Gulf, Red Sea, and camel caravans to reach the eastern Mediterranean.

The Republic of Venice had gained control over much of the trade routes between Europe and Asia. After traditional land routes to India had been closed by the Ottoman Turks, Portugal hoped to use the sea route pioneered by da Gama to break the once Venetian trading monopoly. Portuguese rule in the African Great Lakes region focused mainly on a coastal strip centered around Mombasa. The Portuguese presence in the area officially began after 1505, when flagships under the command of Don Francisco de Almeida conquered Kilwa, an island located in what is now southern Tanzania.

In March 1505, having received from Manuel I of Portugal the appointment of viceroy of the newly conquered territory in India, he set sail from Lisbon in command of a large and powerful fleet, and arrived in July at Quiloa (Kilwa), which yielded to him almost without a struggle. A much more vigorous resistance was offered by the Moors of Mombasa. However, the town was taken and destroyed, and its large treasures went to strengthen the resources of Almeida. Attacks followed on Hoja (now known as Ungwana, located at the mouth of the Tana River), Barawa, Angoche, Pate and other coastal towns until the western Indian Ocean was a safe haven for Portuguese commercial interests. At other places on his way, such as the island of Angediva, near Goa, and Cannanore, the Portuguese built forts, and adopted measures to secure the Portuguese supremacy.

Portugal's main goal on the Swahili coast was to take control of the spice trade from the Arabs. At this stage, the Portuguese presence in East Africa served the purposes of controlling trade within the Indian Ocean and securing the sea routes linking Europe to Asia. Portuguese naval vessels were very disruptive to the commerce of Portugal's enemies within the western Indian Ocean and were able to demand high tariffs on items transported through the sea due to their strategic control of ports and shipping lanes. The construction of Fort Jesus in Mombasa in 1593 was meant to solidify Portuguese hegemony in the region, but their influence was clipped by the British, Dutch and Omani Arab incursions into the Great Lakes region during the 17th century.

The Omani Arabs posed the most direct challenge to Portuguese influence in the African Great Lakes region.By this time, the Portuguese Empire had already lost its interest on the spice trade sea route due to the decreasing profitability of that business. The Arabs reclaimed much of the Indian Ocean trade, forcing the Portuguese to retreat south where they remained in Portuguese East Africa (Mozambique) as sole rulers until the 1975 independence of Mozambique.

Omani Arab colonization of the Kenyan and Tanzanian coasts brought the once independent city-states under closer foreign scrutiny and domination than was experienced during the Portuguese period. Like their predecessors, the Omani Arabs were primarily able only to control the coastal areas, not the interior. However, the creation of clove plantations, intensification of the slave trade and relocation of the Omani capital to Zanzibar in 1839 by Seyyid Said had the effect of consolidating the Omani power in the region.

Arab governance of all the major ports along the Swahili coast continued until British interests aimed particularly at ending the slave trade and creation of a wage-labour system began to put pressure on Omani rule. By the late nineteenth century, the slave trade on the open seas had been completely outlawed by the British and the Omani Arabs had little ability to resist the British navy's ability to enforce the directive. The Omani presence continued in Zanzibar and Pemba until the Zanzibar Revolution in 1964. However, the official Omani Arab presence in Kenya was checked by German and British seizure of key ports and creation of crucial trade alliances with influential local leaders in the 1880s.

Period of European imperialism

Between the 19th and 20th century, East Africa became a theatre of competition between the major imperialistic European nations of the time. The three main colors of the African country were beige, red, and blue. The red stood for the English, blue stood for the French, and the beige stood for Germany during the period of colonialism. During the period of the Scramble for Africa, almost every country in the larger region to varying degrees became part of a European colonial empire.

Portugal had first established a strong presence in southern Mozambique and the Indian Ocean since the 15th century, while during this period their possessions increasingly grew including parts from the present northern Mozambique country, up to Mombasa in present-day Kenya. At Lake Malawi, they finally met the recently created British Protectorate of Nyasaland (nowadays Malawi), which surrounded the homonymous lake on three sides, leaving the Portuguese the control of lake's eastern coast. The British Empire set foot in the region's most exploitable and promising lands acquiring what is today Uganda, and Kenya. The Protectorate of Uganda and the Colony of Kenya were located in a rich farmland area mostly appropriate for the cultivation of cash crops like coffee and tea, as well as for animal husbandry with products produced from cattle and goats, such as goat meat, beef and milk. Moreover, this area had the potential for a significant residential expansion, being suitable for the relocation of a large number of British nationals to the region. Prevailing climatic conditions and the regions' geomorphology allowed the establishment of flourishing European style settlements like Nairobi, Vila Pery, Vila Junqueiro, Porto Amélia, Lourenço Marques and Entebbe.

The French settled the largest island of the Indian Ocean (and the fourth-largest globally), Madagascar, along with a group of smaller islands nearby, namely Réunion and the Comoros. Madagascar became part of the French colonial empire following two military campaigns against the Kingdom of Madagascar, which it initiated after persuading Britain to relinquish its interests in the island in exchange for control of Zanzibar off the coast of Tanganyika, an important island hub of the spices trade. The British also held a number of island colonies in the region, including the extended archipelago of Seychelles and the rich farming island of Mauritius, previously under the French sovereignty.

The German Empire gained control of a large area named German East Africa, comprising present-day Rwanda, Burundi and the mainland part of Tanzania named Tanganyika. In 1922, the British gained a League of Nations mandate over Tanganyika which it administered until Independence was granted to Tanganyika in 1961. Following the Zanzibar Revolution of 1965, the independent state of Tanganyika formed the United Republic of Tanzania by creating a union between the mainland, and the island chain of Zanzibar. Zanzibar is now a semi-autonomous state in a union with the mainland which is collectively and commonly referred to as Tanzania. German East Africa, though very extensive, was not of such strategic importance as the British Crown's colonies to the north: the inhabitation of these lands was difficult and thus limited, mainly due to climatic conditions and the local geomorphology. Italy gained control of various parts of Somalia in the 1880s. The southern three-fourths of Somalia became an Italian protectorate (Italian Somaliland).

Meanwhile, in 1884, a narrow coastal strip of Somaliland came under British control (British Somaliland). This Somaliland protectorate was just opposite the British colony of Aden on the Arabian Peninsula. With these territories secured, Britain was able to serve as gatekeeper of the sea lane leading to British India. In 1890, beginning with the purchase of the small port town of (Asseb) from a local sultan in Eritrea, the Italians colonized all of Eritrea.

In 1895, from bases in Somalia and Eritrea, the Italians launched the First Italo–Ethiopian War against the Orthodox Empire of Ethiopia. By 1896, the war had become a total disaster for the Italians and Ethiopia was able to retain its independence. Ethiopia remained independent until 1936 when, after the Second Italo-Abyssinian War, it became part of Italian East Africa. The Italian occupation of Ethiopia ended in 1941 during World War II as part of the East African Campaign.The French also staked out an East African outpost on the route to French Indochina. Starting in the 1850s, the small protectorate of Djibouti became French Somaliland in 1897.

Post-colonial period

Climate 
Eastern Africa has a diverse climate change that consist of hot, dry desert regions, cooler,  and highlands.

Popular depictions 
There are movies that have depicted East Africa in various forms. 7 Days in Entebbe, The Last King of Scotland, Out of Africa, Queen of Katwe, The Constant Gardener, Hotel Rwanda, The Good Lie, and Captain Phillips are a few of the critically acclaimed movies. In the video games Halo 2 and Halo 3, East Africa is one of the central locations for the campaigns.

Culture

Art

Architecture

Clothing

Cuisine

Music

Religion

Languages

In the Horn of Africa and Nile Valley, Afroasiatic languages predominate, including languages of the family's Cushitic (such as Beja, Oromo and Somali), Semitic (such as Amharic, Arabic and Tigrinya), and Omotic (such as Wolaytta) branches.

In the African Great Lakes region, Niger-Congo languages of the Bantu branch are most widely spoken. Among these languages are Kikuyu, Luhya, Kinyarwanda, Kirundi, Kisukuma, Luganda and many others. Swahili, with at least 80 million speakers as a first or second language, is an important trade language in the Great Lakes area. It has official status in Tanzania, Kenya and Uganda.

Nilotic languages, such as Luo, Kalenjin, Maasai and Nuer, are spoken in lesser numbers, primarily in the African Great Lakes and Nile Valley.

Indo-European languages, such as English, French and Portuguese, remain important in higher institutions in some parts of the larger region.

Demographics

Eastern Africa had an estimated population of 260 million in 2000. This was projected to reach 890 million by 2050, with an average growth rate of 2.5% per annum. The 2000 population is expected to quintuple over the course of the 21st century, to 1.6 billion as of 2100 (UN estimates as of 2017). In Ethiopia, there is an estimated population of 102 million as of 2016.

Architecture

Further information in the sections of Architecture of Africa:
 Ancient Eastern African Architecture
 Medieval Eastern African Architecture

Science and technology

Further information in the sections of History of science and technology in Africa:

 Astronomy
 Metallurgy
 Medicine
 Agriculture
 Textiles
 Maritime technology
 Architecture
 Communication systems
 Commerce
 By country

Conflicts
Since the end of colonialism, several East African countries were riven with military coups, ethnic violence and oppressive dictators. The region has endured the following post-colonial conflicts:

Northern East Africa (Horn of Africa)
 Ethiopian Civil War 1974–1991
 Eritrean War of Independence 1961–1991
 Eritrean-Ethiopian War 1998–2000
 Ogaden War 1977–1978
Dijboutian Civil War 1991–1994
 Somali Civil War 1991–2009
South Sudan
 Second Sudanese Civil War 1983–2005
 Internal Political-ethnic Conflict 2011–ongoing
 South Sudanese Civil War 2013–2015
Southern East Africa (Southeast Africa)
 Burundian Civil War 1993–2005 and the genocide of Hutus in 1972 and genocide of Tutsis in 1993
 Uganda–Tanzania War 1978–1979
 Ugandan Bush War 1981–1986
 Lord's Resistance Army insurgency in Uganda, South Sudan and Democratic Republic of the Congo ongoing
 Rwandan Civil War 1990–1993 and the Rwandan genocide against the Tutsi
 Zanzibar Revolution 1964
Outside Southeast Africa with Southeast African participation
 First Congo War 1996–1997 and Second Congo War 1998–2003
 Kivu Conflict (Laurent Nkunda Rebellion)

Kenya has enjoyed relatively stable governance. However, politics have been turbulent at times, including the attempted coup d'état in 1982 and the 2007 election riots.

Tanzania has known stable government since independence although there are significant political and religious tensions resulting from the political union between Tanganyika and Zanzibar in 1964. Zanzibar is a semi-autonomous state in the United Republic of Tanzania.

Tanzania and Uganda fought the Uganda–Tanzania War in 1978–1979, which led to the removal of Uganda's despotic leader Idi Amin.

Burundi, Rwanda, and Uganda have each faced instability and ethnic conflict since independence, most notably the 1994 Rwandan genocide and the 1993 Burundi genocide and subsequent Burundian Civil War. Rwanda and Uganda continue to be involved in related conflicts outside the region.

Djibouti, as well as the Puntland and Somaliland regions of Somalia, have also seen relative stability.

South Sudan peacefully seceded from the Sudan in 2011, six and a half years after a peace agreement ended the Second Sudanese Civil War. South Sudanese independence was nearly derailed by the South Kordofan conflict, particularly a dispute over the status of the Abyei Area, and both Abyei and South Kordofan's Nuba Hills remained a source of tension between Juba and Khartoum .

Countries, capitals and largest cities

According to the CIA, as of 2017, the countries in the eastern Africa region have a total population of around 537.9 million inhabitants.

See also

African historiography
Sub-Saharan Africa
West Africa
Southern Africa
Central Africa
North Africa
Horn of Africa

References

Bibliography
 

East Africa
Geography of East Africa
Regions of Africa